Tropical Storm Chris was the fourth tropical storm of the 2006 Atlantic hurricane season. Forming on July 31 in the Atlantic Ocean east of the Leeward Islands from a tropical wave, Chris moved generally to the west-northwest, skirting the northern fringes of the Caribbean islands. The storm gradually weakened before finally dissipating on August 5, near eastern Cuba. Overall impact was minimal, amounting to moderate amounts of rainfall throughout its path. No deaths were reported.

Meteorological history 

A tropical wave moved westward off the coast of Africa on July 27. Initially, vigorous convection persisted throughout the wave axis, though dry air greatly diminished the convection on July 28. The wind field remained well-defined as it continued westward, and deep convection increased two days later along the northern end of the wave axis. Dvorak classifications began on July 30 in response to an increase in vertical depth and organization of the convection. On July 31 a buoy recorded a change of wind direction from northeast to west, indicating a small low pressure area formed.

Forecasters initially predicted wind shear from an upper-level low would prevent strengthening and cause dissipation within three days. However, the depression continued to organize as deep convection continued to develop near the circulation despite moderate amounts of wind shear, and the system intensified into Tropical Storm Chris six hours after developing. The structure of Chris continued to improve and become more symmetrical, and an upper level eye feature developed early on August 2. Despite initial predictions of Chris intensifying to a hurricane as a ridge of high pressure forced it west-northwestward, upper-level shear dissipated the well-defined inner core of the storm, and Chris started to weaken.

Early on August 3, strong wind shear over Chris detached the deep convection from the low level circulation, while a building ridge to its north turned the storm towards the west into an area of drier air. By mid-day on the 3rd the circulation was devoid of any convection within , while the deeper convection spread across Puerto Rico and Hispaniola. Late on August 3, deep convection developed over the center of circulation again, though persistent vertical shear weakened Chris to a tropical depression on August 4. Due to computer models predicting lesser amounts of shear, forecasters indicated the possibility of moderate strengthening in the Gulf of Mexico to a  storm. However, convection remained minimal, and Chris degenerated into a remnant area of low pressure late on August 4. Late on August 5, convection increased in the remnants of the storm, and forecasters indicated the potential for slow development over the Gulf of Mexico due to marginally favorable conditions. Redevelopment never occurred, and the remnant circulation dissipated near Havana, Cuba on August 6.

Preparations 

When the National Hurricane Center issued its first advisory on Tropical Depression Three, the governments of Antigua and Barbuda, Anguilla, Saint Kitts and Nevis, and the British Virgin Islands issued a Tropical Storm Warning for their respective territories. When the depression strengthened to Tropical Storm Chris, Tropical Storm Warnings were also issued for Saba, Sint Eustatius, Saint-Barthélemy, and Saint Martin. Three Royal Caribbean cruise ships re-routed their paths to avoid the storm. Federal Emergency Management Agency (FEMA) representatives coordinated with local emergency management officials in the United States Virgin Islands to determine if preparation necessities would be adequate, such as hospital usage, shelters, and sand bags.

On August 1, officials in Puerto Rico issued a tropical storm warning for the island. The next day, approximately 600 tourists evacuated the islands of Vieques and Culebra. On August 2, the government of the Bahamas issued a Hurricane Watch for the Turks and Caicos Islands, the Acklins and Crooked Islands, Ragged Island, Inagua, and Mayaguana. In response to the threat, officials urged citizens to stock up on hurricane supplies, while boat owners in Staniel Cay secured their boats in preparation for the storm.

In response to the storm's projected path into the Gulf of Mexico, prices for crude oil rose on the New York Mercantile Exchange at branch offices in London. Natural gas prices rose considerably in New York Mercantile Exchange electronic trading on August 2. Anticipation of a threat to supply by a potential Hurricane Chris coupled with high demand during an ongoing heat wave were cited as factors in the price move. In New Orleans, officials including Mayor Ray Nagin prepared for a possible evacuation of the city if Chris entered the Gulf of Mexico as a hurricane. The evacuation plan included moving all residents out of the city as a worst-case scenario, intended to avoid a re-occurrence of Hurricane Katrina around one year prior. Florida Emergency Management requested ten mobile recovery centers, and placed hospitals in the Florida Keys on standby for evacuation. Officials in Mississippi identified the need for 110 to assist in an evacuation process in case of a possible landfall. Both Louisiana and Texas emergency operation centers monitored the progress of the storm, though did not execute any preparation action.

Impact 

Despite its initial threat, Chris caused little impact in the Lesser Antilles. Overall damage from Chris was minimal. The rainfall from the storm caused the Fajardo River to overflow its banks, which temporarily closed a highway in the northeastern portion of the island.

Rainfall reached up to 2 inches (50 mm) across portions of Hispaniola, the Turks and Caicos, the Bahamas, and eastern Cuba, and reached  in some mountainous areas. In Santo Domingo in the Dominican Republic, heavy rainfall caused severe flooding. Las Américas reported  of rainfall from Chris. Several people were left temporarily homeless due to flooding entering their households. The flooding left many roads impassable near the capital city, and also resulted in landslides. The flooding also covered rice fields in the northeastern portion of the country. The National Office of Meteorology issued flood warnings for residents in low-lying areas and near rivers in the northeast and southeast portions of the country. Despite the flooding, overall damage was minor, and there are no casualties associated with Chris.

See also 

 Other tropical cyclones of the same name

References

External links 

 National Hurricane Center's archive on Tropical Storm Chris

2006 Atlantic hurricane season
2006 in the Caribbean
Atlantic tropical storms
Chris 2006
Chris 2006
Chris